The 2005 World Taekwondo Championships were the 17th edition of the World Taekwondo Championships, and were held in Madrid, Spain from 13 to 17 April 2005.

Medal summary

Men

Women

Medal table

Team ranking
South Korea won both men’s and women’s team titles at the 2005 WTF World Taekwondo Championships.

Men

Women

References

WTF Medal Winners

External links
Official Website

World Championships
Taekwondo Championships
World Taekwondo Championships
International taekwondo competitions hosted by Spain
Taekwondo in Spain